Tangram is a village development committee in Baglung District in the Dhaulagiri Zone of central Nepal. At the time of the 2001 Nepal census it had a population of 3,907 (2,121 females and 1,786 males) and had 740 houses in the village.

References

Populated places in Baglung District